is the Japanese fifth tier of league football, which is part of the Japanese Regional Leagues. It covers the regions of Hokuriku and Shin'etsu, the prefectures of Fukui, Ishikawa, Nagano, Niigata and Toyama.

2022 clubs 
 Division 1 

 Division 2

Hokushin'etsu Soccer League Champions

External links 
  

Football leagues in Japan
Sports leagues established in 1975